Rui Costa Pimenta (born in São Paulo, 25 June 1957) is a Brazilian politician and a perennial presidential candidate aligned with the Trotskyist Workers' Cause Party.

He was their candidate in the 2002, 2006, 2010 and 2014 presidential elections and placed last in all of the elections he ran.

References 

Anti-Americanism
Anti-imperialism in South America
Brazilian anti-capitalists
Living people
People from São Paulo
1957 births
Workers' Cause Party politicians
Candidates for President of Brazil
Brazilian communists